Pseudophanes is a genus of moths in the subfamily Arctiinae. Its single species, Pseudophanes melanoptera, is found in Australia. Both the genus and species were first described by Turner in 1940.

References

Lithosiini
Monotypic moth genera
Moths of Australia